Fresnay-en-Retz (literally Fresnay in Retz) is a former commune in the Loire-Atlantique department in western France. On 1 January 2016, it was merged into the new commune of Villeneuve-en-Retz.

See also
Communes of the Loire-Atlantique department

References

Fresnayenretz
Populated places disestablished in 2016